O Canto da Sereia (English: Siren's Song) is a Brazilian miniseries produced and broadcast by Rede Globo in 2013. Starring Ísis Valverde, Marcos Palmeira, João Miguel, Fabíula Nascimento, Marcos Caruso, Marcelo Médici, Fábio Lago, Gabriel Braga Nunes and Camila Morgado.

Cast

International Broadcasts

References

External links 
  
 

Brazilian television miniseries
2013 Brazilian television series debuts
2013 Brazilian television series endings
Portuguese-language television shows
Rede Globo original programming
Television shows set in Brazil
Salvador, Bahia in fiction
Television shows filmed in Bahia
Telenovelas by Glória Perez